Tyler Brenner (born April 5, 1988) is a Canadian professional ice hockey defenceman. He is currently playing with the Toledo Walleye of the ECHL.

Brenner played NCAA college hockey with the RIT Tigers men's ice hockey team.

On March 21, 2011, the Toronto Maple Leafs of the National Hockey League signed Brenner a two-year entry level contract, and he was assigned to play with the Toronto Marlies of the American Hockey League for the remainder of the 2010–11 AHL season.

Awards and honours

References

External links

1988 births
Living people
Bakersfield Condors (1998–2015) players
Canadian ice hockey defencemen
Reading Royals players
RIT Tigers men's ice hockey players
Toledo Walleye players
Toronto Marlies players
People from the Regional Municipality of Waterloo
Ice hockey people from Ontario